Peace Be Still is the live album of gospel singer James Cleveland and The Angelic Choir of the First Baptist Church of Nutley, NJ, a choir directed by Rev. Lawrence Roberts. It was recorded on September 19, 1963, at Trinity Seventh Day Adventist Church in Newark, NJ, and released in 1964 under Savoy Records.

Track listing
All tracks written or arranged by James Cleveland unless noted.

 "Peace Be Still" - 6:06
 "Jesus Saves" - 10:26
 "I Had a Talk with God" - 4:15
 "Where He Leads Me" (traditional) - 3:31
 "Shine on Me" (traditional) - 7:09
 "The Lord Brought Us Out" - 3:47
 "I'll Wear a Crown" - 5:45
 "I'll Be Caught Up to Meet Him" - 4:39
 "Praise God" (traditional) - 2:11

1963 live albums
Savoy Records live albums
James Cleveland albums
United States National Recording Registry recordings
United States National Recording Registry albums